This is the discography of Hong Kong singer Leslie Cheung.

Studio albums and EPs

Live albums

Compilation albums

Remix albums

Limited releases

Compositions

Music

Lyrics

References

Cheung, Leslie
Pop music discographies
Leslie Cheung